Enteroctopus magnificus, also known as the southern giant octopus, is a large octopus in the genus Enteroctopus. It is native to the waters off Namibia and South Africa.

Description 

E. magnificus bears the distinctive characteristics of the genus Enteroctopus, including longitudinal folds on the body and large, paddle-like papillae. E. magnificus is a large octopus, reaching total lengths of up to 1.8 m and a mass of 11.4 kg.

Range and habitat 

E. magnificus occurs from Namibia to Port Elizabeth, South Africa.  It is found primarily on sand and mud flats from shallow subtidal areas to about 1000 m depth.

Predators 

E. magnificus is predated on by the South African fur seal (Arctocephalus pusillus pusillus) and the leafscale gulper shark  (Centrophorus squamosus).

Diet 

Like many octopuses, E. magnificus is a generalist predator. The chief food source for this octopus is the deep-sea portunid crab Bathynectes piperitus.  Other major prey items include the Cape hagfish (Myxine capensis), the crab species Pontophilus gracilis, and hermit crabs in the genus Parapagurus.

Fisheries 

E. magnificus is only collected by trawl and in lobster pots. Harvest of this octopus is small, mainly as a finfish trawl fisheries by-catch.

References

External links 

Octopodidae
Molluscs described in 1992